Idaea, sometimes called Hyriogona (among other synonyms), is a large genus of geometer moths. It was erected by Georg Friedrich Treitschke in 1825. They are found nearly worldwide, with many native to the Mediterranean, the African savannas, and the deserts of western Asia.

As of 2013, there were about 680 species in the genus.

Species

References

Sterrhini
Geometridae genera
Taxa named by Georg Friedrich Treitschke